Lawrence Otto Bensemann (4 March 1891 – 23 September 1969) was a New Zealand professional rugby league footballer who played in the 1910s. He played at representative level for New Zealand (Heritage № 101), and Wellington, as a forward (prior to the specialist positions of), during the era of contested scrums.

Early life and family
Born in Motueka in 1891, Bensemann was educated at Nelson College from 1904 to 1906. He was the uncle of artist Leo Bensemann.

Playing career

International honours
Bensemann represented New Zealand in 1913 against New South Wales.

World War 1 and 2
Lawrence Bensemann served in both world wars. He enlisted in 1915 and at the time was married to Charlotte Bensemann and stated his address as Sutherland Road in Maranui. Following the war he worked as an accountant and was living on Konini Rd in Hataitai. In October 1924 he found a body on Mount Victoria.

References

External links

Search for "Bensemann" at rugbyleagueproject.org

1891 births
1969 deaths
New Zealand national rugby league team players
New Zealand rugby league players
People educated at Nelson College
Rugby league forwards
Rugby league players from Motueka
Wellington rugby league team players